The Canadian Immigration Hospital was an acute care hospital located in Halifax, Nova Scotia at Pier 21.

References

Hospitals in Halifax, Nova Scotia